Liberton Hospital is a facility for geriatric medicine on Lasswade Road in Edinburgh, Scotland. It is managed by NHS Lothian.

History
The hospital, which was designed by John Dick Peddie and George Washington Browne opened in 1906. It operated in partnership with the Longmore Hospital and the two hospitals together became known as the Royal Edinburgh Hospital for Incurables. The hospital joined the National Health Service in 1948 and a new four‑storey geriatric facility was built on the site in 1963.

In 2014, the health board considered proposals to demolish the hospital and three others, with a view to replacing these facilities with care villages which would consist of buildings more suited to social care.

References

NHS Lothian
NHS Scotland hospitals
Hospitals in Edinburgh